Hövel is a village and a former municipality in North Rhine-Westphalia, Germany. It is a part (Ortschaft) of the town of Sundern.

References

Former municipalities in North Rhine-Westphalia
Hochsauerlandkreis